"I Can't Wait" is a song by the American singer and songwriter Stevie Nicks from her third solo studio album Rock a Little (1985). Written by Nicks, Rick Nowels, and Eric Pressly, the song was released as the album's lead single in Australia, the United Kingdom and Ireland, and as the second single in the United States and Germany.

Background
"I Can't Wait" was recorded in 1985 at The Village studio in West Los Angeles and was written by Nicks, Rick Nowels, and Eric Pressly. The song was produced by Nowles and Jimmy Iovine, who had worked with Nicks since her 1981 Bella Donna album but later left the Rock a Little project.

Nicks explained the song in depth in the liner notes of her 1991 compilation album Timespace: The Best of Stevie Nicks: 
"To understand this song, you sort of have to let yourself go a little crazy. Love is blind, it never works out, but you just have to have it. I think this was about the most exciting song that I had ever heard. My friend, Rick, whom I had known since I was 18 and he was 13, brought over this track with this incredible percussion thing, and gave it to me asking me if I would listen to it and consider writing a song for it. I listened to the song once, and pretended not to be that knocked out, but the second Rick left, I ran in my little recording studio and wrote 'I Can't Wait.' It took all night, and I think it is all about how electric I felt about this music. And that night, that SATURDAY night, Rick and I went into a BIG studio and recorded it. I sang it only once, and have never sung it since in the studio. Some vocals are magic and simply not able to beat. So I let go of it, as new to me as it was; but you know, now when I hear it on the radio, this incredible feeling comes over me, like something really incredible is about to happen."

Chart performance
"I Can't Wait" first charted in Australia, debuting on the Kent Music Report chart on 13 January 1986,  peaking at No. 20 in February. The single first entered the UK Singles Chart on 25 January 1986, peaking at No. 54 in early February; Nicks' first single to chart in the UK since "Stop Draggin' My Heart Around" in 1981. "I Can't Wait" spent a week on the Irish Singles Chart peaking at No. 29 on 23 January 1986. In New Zealand, the single entered the chart on 16 February 1986, peaking at No. 39 the following week. In the United States, the single peaked inside the top 20, peaking at No. 16 for two weeks on the Billboard Hot 100 and is one of only four of Nicks' singles to enter the Dance Club Songs chart, peaking inside the top 30. In Germany, "I Can't Wait" entered the chart in early May 1986, peaking at No. 58 two weeks later.

The single's American chart run coincided with that of a Nu Shooz song also titled "I Can't Wait".

The song was re-issued as a single in the UK and Europe in October 1991, to promote the Timespace: The Best of Stevie Nicks compilation album. The single peaked marginally higher in the UK on this release, at No. 47 in November 1991.

Music video
The music video for "I Can't Wait" was directed by Marty Callner. The music video features Nicks, her brother Christopher, Sharon Celani, and Lori Perry-Nicks (Nicks’ longtime back-up singers), choreographer Brad Jeffries and a cheeky Mick Fleetwood on a stage and on a set of stairs.

Nicks also performs parts by herself in a small room which could be a interpreted as a prison cell. Nicks is primarily dressed in black and sings the song in front of a microphone and sometimes a tambourine, which goes back to Nicks' trademark image of her performances of "Rhiannon" with Fleetwood Mac.

Nicks says that she did drugs on the set of all her videos of the era, however, regarding the video for "I Can't Wait" she said in I Want My MTV: "I look at that video, I look at my eyes, and I say to myself, 'Could you have laid off the pot, the coke and the tequila for three days, so you could have looked a little better? It just makes me want to go back into that video and stab myself." 

An earlier, alternative edit of the music video aired in Australia, due to the single's earlier release there.

Live performances
"I Can't Wait" was performed for the first time on the Rock a Little tour in 1986 and this was the only tour to feature the song.

Official releases
An extended mix of "I Can't Wait" was released towards the end of 1985 in most territories such as the United States, the United Kingdom and Germany. The extended mix also included the standard version of the song and the Rock a Little album track "Rock a Little (Go Ahead Lily)". The 7" single release simply featured the standard version and "Rock a Little (Go Ahead Lily)". A 1986 release in the US featured a b-side "The Nightmare", the release was called The Nightmare extended mix.

The 5-track U.S. 12" release of "I Can't Wait", in one of the most iconic picture sleeves of Nicks' career, includes:

Side A
"I Can't Wait" (Rock Mix) — 5:57
"I Can't Wait" (Dance Mix) — 6:20

Side B
"The Nightmare" (Special Extended Vocal Remix) — 6:38
"I Can't Wait" (Dub Dance Mix) — 4:23
"I Can't Wait" (Dub Rock Mix) — 5:46

Rock Mix by Chris Lord-Alge, Dub Rock Mix by Steve Thompson, Dance Mix and Dub Dance Mix by Michael Barbiero

The song appears in original form on the aforementioned 1991 Timespace album as well as the 2007 greatest hits album Crystal Visions – The Very Best of Stevie Nicks. It was re-released off of Timespace in the UK, reaching number 47 on its component chart.

In other media
The song was featured in the 2013 video game Grand Theft Auto V on the in-game radio station Los Santos Rock Radio.

Charts

Weekly charts

References

1986 singles
Stevie Nicks songs
Song recordings produced by Jimmy Iovine
Music videos directed by Marty Callner
1985 songs
Songs written by Rick Nowels
Songs written by Stevie Nicks
Song recordings produced by Rick Nowels
Modern Records (1980) singles